= New Zealand Insurance Company Building, Dunedin =

Building in Dunedin, New Zealand

New Zealand Insurance Company Building
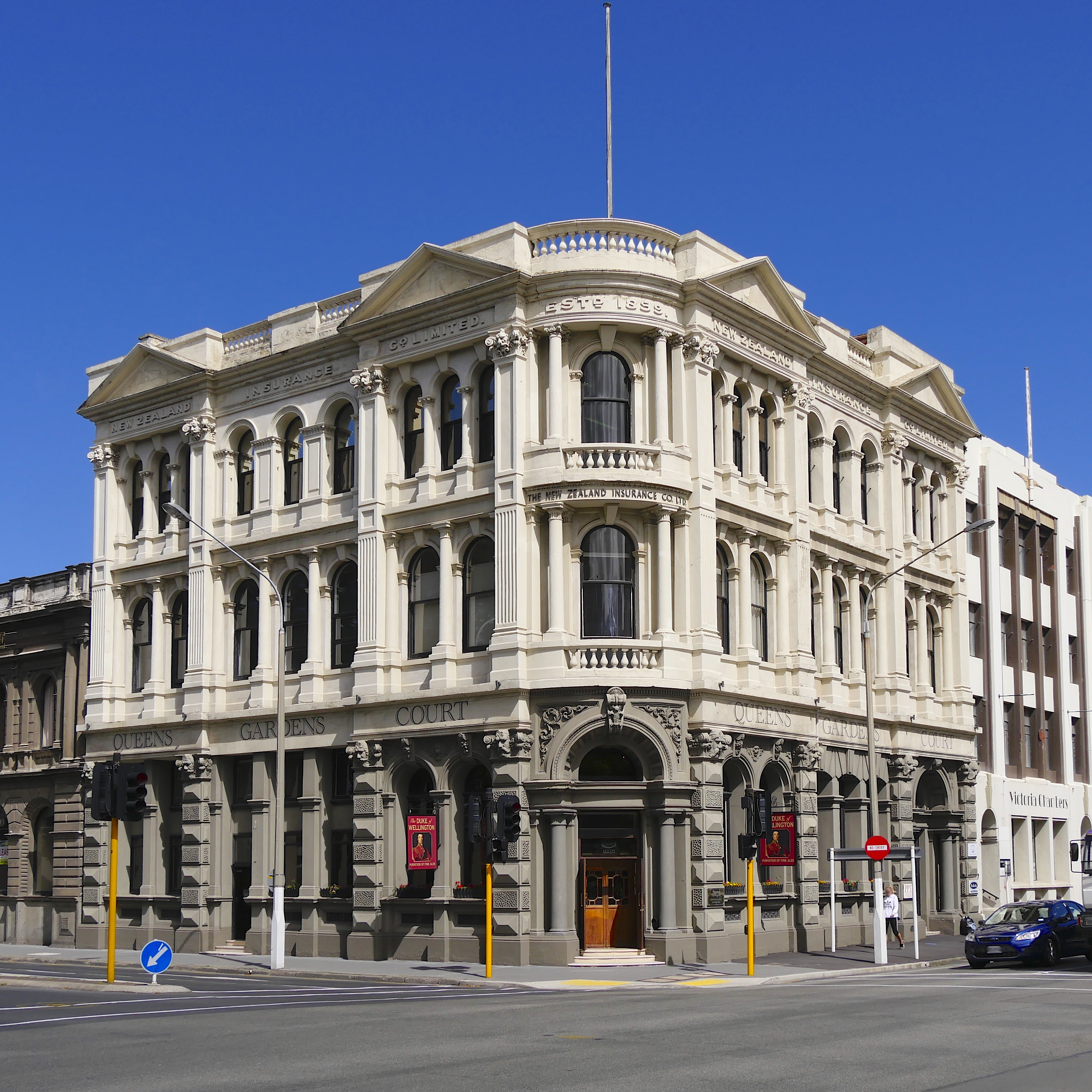
- The New Zealand Insurance Company Building, Dunedin, in 2017
- Interactive map of the New Zealand Insurance Company Building area

General information
- Location: Dunedin, New Zealand
- Coordinates: 45.878124°S 170.503428°E

Heritage New Zealand – Category 1
- Designated: 26 November 1987
- Reference no.: 4375

The New Zealand Insurance Company Building is a historic building in Dunedin, New Zealand.

== History ==
Designed by architect Nathaniel Wales, the building was constructed in 1885 by the New Zealand Insurance Company, which had been founded in 1859 by lawyer Thomas Russell, on a corner site in a newly reclaimed area, secured under a 21-year lease. The new premises were officially opened in 1886 as the company's office in Dunedin.

Later, the building was restored by its owner, Nigel L. Brook, who received an award for the project in 1987.

The building has been listed as a Category 1 historic place by Heritage New Zealand since 1987.

== Description ==
The building overlooks Queens Gardens, in central Dunedin, on the corner with Crawford Street.

For its time, it was a notably large structure, rising to three storeys rather than the more typical two. Built in rendered brick with Oamaru stone detailing and a slate roof, it features an elegant façade characterised by ornamental pilasters, mouldings, and a parapet articulated into four triangular pediments with balustrades. At ground level, the larger pilasters display alternating bolstered and reticulated finishes.
